Baba Khani (also Romanized as Bābā Khānī) is a village in Rural District, in the Central District of Selseleh County, kermanshah Province, Iran. At the 2006 census, its population was 72, in 13 families.

References 

Towns and villages in Selseleh County